Aleksandr Loktaev or Oleksandr Lokatev (born 10 January 1994) is a motorcycle speedway rider from Ukraine.

Career
Loktaev first rode in Poland for Falubaz Zielona Góra in the 2010 Polish speedway season. In 2010, he qualified for the 2010 Individual Speedway Junior World Championship Semi-Final One but one week before the Semi-Final, Loktaev was injured in a Danish Speedway League match between Holstebro and Vojens. He was replaced by track reserve Simon Nielsen.

In 2011, he represented the Ukraine national speedway team during the 2011 Speedway World Cup Qualification and then competed in two more World Cups in 2012 and 2013. He was also part of the Ukraine team that returned to the international stage to compete in the 2018 Speedway of Nations and has since ridden in the 2021 Speedway of Nations.

He had ridden in Poland every year since 2010, with the exception of 2022. For the 2023 season he joined PSŻ Poznań.2012 Speedway World Cup

Results

World team Championships
2011 Speedway World Cup - qualification round
2012 Speedway World Cup - qualification round
2013 Speedway World Cup - qualification round
2018 Speedway of Nations - Race off
2021 Speedway of Nations - 2nd semi final

U-21 World Championship
2010 World U21 Championships - injured before the Semi-Final One''

Domestic competitions 
 Team Polish Championship (Polish league)
 2010 - for Zielona Góra
 Individual Under-21 Russian Championship
 2009 -  Tolyatti - Runner-up (14 pts)
 Individual Under-21 Ukrainian Championship
 2009 - three events - 4th placed (23 pts in two events only)

See also 
 Ukraine national under-21 speedway team

References 

1994 births
Living people
Ukrainian speedway riders